Gloria Material Technology Corp. (GMTC) is a company headquartered in Liouying industrial zone, Tainan, Taiwan. It is the only specialty alloy professional manufacturer in Taiwan which owns melting, forging, rolling, heat treating and finishing processes. GMTC provides more than 500 steel grades such as superalloy, titanium alloy, ESR & VAR steel, high speed steel, stainless steel, quenched-tempered steel, tool steel, special steel profile and precision parts machining. The main product shapes are focused on round bars and square bars.

Products

 Superalloy
 Titanium alloy: ti-bar, ti-sheet, titanium welding coil, ti-tube, forging / machining parts
 VAR (vacuum arc remelting) & ESR (electro-slag remelting) steel
 Stainless steel: 300 series, 400 series, precipitation hardening, duplex
 Tool steel: cold work tool steel, hot work tool steel, low alloy steel, bearing steel
 High speed steel
 Quenched & tempered steel: alloy steel +QT, stainless steel +QT
 Plastic mold steel: round bar, block
 Special steel profile
 Precision parts machining

Affiliated companies 
 Taiwan
 S-Tech Corp.: titanium and nickel alloy, precision finish and engineering integration
 Homkom Precision Industry Corp.: special steel profile hot rolling, cold drawing, closed die forging and precision part machining
 Golden Win Steel Industrial Corp.: Gloria group logistic service in Taoyuan, Taichung and Tainan in Taiwan

 China Mainland
 Goldway Special Metal Co.,Ltd. (Guangzhon): Gloria group logistic service in Guangzhou
 Goldway Special Metal Co.,Ltd. (Tianjin): Gloria group logistic service in Tianjin
 Goldway Special Metal Co.,Ltd. (Zhejiang Jiaxing ): Gloria group logistic service in Zhejiang Jiaxing
 Goldway Special Metal Co.,Ltd. (Xi'an): Gloria group logistic service in Xi'an

 Southeast Asia
 Golden Win Steel Industrial Corp. (Vietnam): Gloria group logistic service in Vietnam

 America
 Alloy Tool Steel, Inc.: Gloria group logistic service in the United States

See also
 List of companies of Taiwan

References

External links

 Gloria Material Technology Corp.
 S-Tech Corp.
 Homkom Precision Industry Corp.
 Golden Win Steel Industrial Corp.
 Goldway Special Metal Co.,Ltd
 Alloy Tool Steel, Inc.

Taiwanese companies established in 1993
Steel companies of Taiwan
Manufacturing companies established in 1993